Archibald Twaddle Milliken (24 November 1909 – 1981) was a Scottish footballer who played for Kilmarnock, Dundee United and Dumbarton.

He was born in Dennistoun, Glasgow, the son of insurance agent Arthur Milliken and Elizabeth Twaddle Milliken.

References

1909 births
1981 deaths
Scottish footballers
Scottish Football League players
Dumbarton F.C. players
Kilmarnock F.C. players
Dundee United F.C. players
Rutherglen Glencairn F.C. players
Association football goalkeepers
Date of death missing